Bonar-e Soleymani (also Romanized as Bonār-e Soleymānī; also known as Bonār, Bonār-e Zīārat, and Bunār) is a village in Dashti-ye Esmail Khani Rural District, Ab Pakhsh District, Dashtestan County, Bushehr Province, Iran. At the 2006 census, its population was 169, in 47 families.

References 

Populated places in Dashtestan County